Guilloux is a French surname. Notable people with the surname include:

Charles Guilloux (1866–1946), French artist
Louis Guilloux (1899–1980), French writer
Pierre Guilloux (1901–1937), French high jumper and basketball player

See also
Guillou

French-language surnames